The Bishop of Montreal is an Anglican bishop in the Ecclesiastical Province of Canada. Before the erection of the diocese, its parent Diocese of Quebec had a suffragan bishop of Montreal: George Mountain, 1836–1850. The incumbents have been:

References

 
Anglican bishops